Ram Samujhavan is an Indian politician.  He was elected to the Lok Sabha, the lower house of the Parliament of India from the Saidpur, Uttar Pradesh as a member of the Indian National Congress.

References

External links
Official biographical sketch in Parliament of India website

1921 births
Possibly living people
Lok Sabha members from Uttar Pradesh
India MPs 1984–1989
Indian National Congress politicians